Wharram Percy is a deserted medieval village and former civil parish near Malton, North Yorkshire, on the western edge of the chalk Wolds of North Yorkshire, England. Wharram Percy was part of the East Riding of Yorkshire until the 1974 boundary changes. In 1931 the parish had a population of 40.

The earthworks of the village have been known for many years, and outlines of house platforms were drawn onto the first Ordnance Survey six-inch maps of Yorkshire published in 1854. The site was researched each summer by combined teams of archaeologists, historians and even botanists, from about 1950 to 1990 after it was singled out for study in 1948 by Professor Maurice Beresford of the University of Leeds.

The site is now in the care of Historic England (formerly English Heritage).

History
Although the site seems to have been settled since prehistory, the village appears to have been most active from the 10th to the 12th centuries. The Domesday Book of 1086 records it as 'Warran' or 'Warron'. The suffix 'Percy' stems from the prominent, aristocratic family that owned the area during the Middle Ages.

The Black Death of 1348–49 does not seem to have played a significant part in the desertion of Wharram Percy, although the large fall in population in the country as a whole at that time must have encouraged relocation to larger settlements.

In 1402 or 1403, the Percy family exchanged their holdings in the area with the Hylton family. Following changes in prices and wages during the 15th century, pastoral farming (particularly sheep) was more profitable for landowners than cereal farming. Over the century following, the Hylton family devoted more and more land to sheep, as their employment of agricultural labour decreased. During the early 16th century, the last residents of Wharram Percy were evicted and their homes were demolished to make room for more sheep pasture. On 1 April 1935 the parish was abolished and merged with Raisthorpe and Burdale and Wharram le Street to form Wharram.

Present site

The site is now in the care of Historic England. Although only the ruined church is easily visible above ground, much more of the village layout can be seen in the surrounding fields. Historic England has installed information panels around the site, and provided an audio tour downloadable in mp3 format from its website.

The site has been subject to archaeological investigations since the 1950s. In 2002 English Heritage (now called Historic England) undertook an archaeological investigation and analytical field survey of Wharram Percy. A 2004 study of a sizeable collection of human skeletal remains, excavated from the churchyard of the deserted village, reveals details of disease, diet and death in the rural medieval community. This used the latest scientific techniques to make observations about childhood growth, duration of breastfeeding, and osteoporosis and tuberculosis.

The Yorkshire Wolds Way National Trail passes through the site, and the Centenary Way long-distance footpath passes to the east of the village.

St Martin's Church
St Martin’s Church has evolved, through six phases, between the early 12th and early 17th centuries. The tower collapsed in 1959 and thereafter the interior was excavated, revealing a smaller, mid-11th-century stone church and an earlier, mid- to late 10th-century, timber building.

References

Further reading

External links

Wharram Percy by the former chief guide of the Beresford excavation
English Heritage – History of Wharram Percy
Investigation history at Historic England
Bodies theories at BBC News
English Heritage's investigation of the site in 2002
Abandoned communities ..... Wharram Percy
BBC Radio 4 programme on Wharram Percy

Archaeological sites in North Yorkshire
Deserted medieval villages in North Yorkshire
English Heritage sites in North Yorkshire
Former populated places in North Yorkshire
Former civil parishes in North Yorkshire
Tourist attractions in North Yorkshire
Ryedale